The formal case is a grammatical case that transmits a sense of making a condition as a quality. It can be found in the Hungarian language, more commonly referred to as the essive-formal case.

Grammatical cases